UFC 86: Jackson vs. Griffin was a mixed martial arts (MMA) pay-per-view event held by the Ultimate Fighting Championship (UFC) on July 5, 2008, at the Mandalay Bay Events Center in Las Vegas, Nevada.

Background
The main event was between Quinton "Rampage" Jackson and Forrest Griffin, coaches on The Ultimate Fighter: Team Rampage vs. Team Forrest, and was for Jackson's UFC Light Heavyweight Championship.

A welterweight bout between Steve Bruno and Chris Wilson was originally scheduled to take place at this event. However, the fight would be postponed and instead took place at UFC 87 on August 9, 2008.

Results

Bonus awards
At the end of the night, the UFC awarded $60,000 to each of the fighters who received one of these three awards.
Fight of the Night: Quinton Jackson vs. Forrest Griffin
Knockout of the Night: Melvin Guillard
Submission of the Night: Cole Miller

See also
 Ultimate Fighting Championship
 List of UFC champions
 List of UFC events
 2008 in UFC

References

External links
UFC 86 Event Site
Results from Sherdog

Ultimate Fighting Championship events
2008 in mixed martial arts
Mixed martial arts in Las Vegas
2008 in sports in Nevada